Cire or CIRE may refer to:

Education 

 Chengdu Institute of Radio Engineering, the founding name of the University of Electronic Science and Technology of China in Chengdu, China.

People
 Amadou Ciré Baal (born 1951), Senegalese sports shooter
 George Edward Cire (1922-1985), American judge
 Pape Ciré Dia (born 1980), Senegalese football player
 Robert Cire (1924–2009), American American football coach
 Samba Ciré (born 1898), French athlete

Places
 Ciré-d'Aunis, France

Other
 CIRE-TV, Canadian TV channel